Realicó is a city in La Pampa Province, Argentina. It was founded the second of March in 1907 by Tomás Leopoldo Mullally. The small farming town has a population of about 7,000. There is one stoplight, and it is always blinking. A major employer of the town is the Cargill flour mill, although recently the mill's importance has waned, supporting fewer workers as the economy has become more services-oriented. There are three high schools, including a technical school (EPET), a business school, and a private, Catholic school (IPSF). There are also private English schools, including EIR and CELI. Teenagers from neighboring towns flock to Realicó every Saturday night to go to Ladrillo Disco, a popular nightclub.

References

External links
 City Website (Spanish)
 El Ladrillo Disco (Spanish)

Populated places in La Pampa Province
Cities in Argentina
Argentina
La Pampa Province